Michelle C. Y. Chang (born 1977) is a Professor of Chemistry and Chemical and Biomolecular Engineering at the University of California, Berkeley, and is a recipient of several young scientist awards for her research in biosynthesis of biofuels and pharmaceuticals.

Education
Chang received her B.S. in Biochemistry and B.A. in French Literature from the University of California, San Diego in 1997.

She then moved to the Massachusetts Institute of Technology for graduate school as a National Science Foundation Predoctoral Fellow (1997-2000) and M.I.T./Merck Foundation Predoctoral Fellow (2000-2002). She earned her Ph.D. in 2004 under the direction of JoAnne Stubbe and Daniel G. Nocera. During her graduate work, Chang studied proton-coupled electron transfer processes in ribonucleotide reductase enzymes, and demonstrated the first direct evidence of the radical transfer pathway of class I RNRs.

Following graduate school, she conducted research as a Jane Coffin Childs Memorial Fund for Medical Research Postdoctoral Fellow at University of California, Berkeley with Jay Keasling (2004-2007). At Berkeley, Chang studied enzyme-catalyzed reactions, demonstrating that by expressing plant P450 enzymes in bacteria like E. coli, the E. coli could be engineered to produce terpenoids, a class of natural products often found in drugs. Chang began her independent career at UC Berkeley in 2007.

Awards
2007: The Camille and Henry Dreyfus Foundation New Faculty Award 
2008: Arnold and Mabel Beckman Foundation Young Investigator Award
2008: TR35: Technology Review magazine Young Innovator Award
2009: National Science Foundation Faculty Early Career Development (CAREER) award
2010: Agilent Early Career Professor Award
2011: International Young Talents in Chemistry Award
2011: NIH Director's New Innovator Award
2012: Agnes Fay Morgan Research Award
2015: Arthur C. Cope Scholar Award
2016: Pfizer Award in Enzyme Chemistry

Personal life
Michelle was born in San Diego, California to Chinese immigrant parents from Taiwan. She is married to her colleague in the College of Chemistry, Christopher Chang.

Publications
Chang's scientific papers are listed on her group's website.

References

1977 births
Living people
American women biochemists
American people of Chinese descent
American people of Taiwanese descent
Massachusetts Institute of Technology alumni
People from San Jose, California
University of California, Berkeley alumni
UC Berkeley College of Chemistry faculty
University of California, San Diego alumni
American women chemists
21st-century American women